The 11th New Zealand Parliament was a term of the Parliament of New Zealand.

Elections for this term were held in 4 Māori electorates and 62 European electorates on 27 November and 5 December 1890, respectively. A total of 74 MPs were elected – a reduction on the 95 MPs of the previous Parliament.

Sessions
The 11th Parliament opened on 23 January 1891, following the 1890 general election. It sat for four sessions (with two sessions in 1891), and was prorogued on 8 November 1893.

Party standings

Start of Parliament

End of Parliament

Historical context
In December 1887, the House of Representatives voted to reduce its membership from general electorates from 91 to 70. The 1890 electoral redistribution used the same 1886 census data used for the 1887 electoral redistribution. In addition, three-member electorates were introduced in the four main centres. This resulted in a major restructuring of electorates, with 12 new electorates created.

The 11th Parliament was most significant, as following the 1890 general election, it marked the beginning of party politics in New Zealand with the formation of the Liberal Government, which was to enact major welfare, labour and electoral reforms, including giving the vote to women.

Ministries
The fourth Atkinson Ministry, known as the Scarecrow Ministry, had been the government. The election had returned several "Independent" or "Labour" members as well as the Liberals. Some of Atkinson's conservative colleagues proposed schemes that would keep him in office, but Atkinson, who had been Premier on and off for 14 years, announced that the house would be called on 23 January 1891 to decide. On 21 January Atkinson told his colleagues that he was retiring on doctor's orders, resigned his seat and was sworn into the Legislative Council, and appointed Speaker. When William Rolleston lost the ministerial nomination for Speaker, Edwin Mitchelson announced the resignation of the government. The Governor asked John Ballance to form a government, which he did on 24 January. It was found to have a majority in the house. After a week of debate, the house went into recess until June.

Atkinson was appointed to the Council with six colleagues, on 20 or 22 January 1891. He was widely regarded as having stacked the council before leaving office. There was a 5000-signature petition against the appointments, but they were approved by the Governor, The Earl of Onslow.  The seven appointments on 20 or 22 January to the Council were Atkinson himself plus Charles Bowen, James Fulton, Charles Johnston, John Davies Ormond, William Downie Stewart Sr and John Blair Whyte.

Ballance had considerable difficulty in achieving reform of the Legislative Council, with new appointments to be for seven years rather than life, and he had major disagreements with the Governor. Ballance's victory is seen as establishing an important precedent in the relationship between Governor and Prime Minister.

The Ballance Ministry was the beginning of the Liberal Government, which lasted until 1912. John Ballance died suddenly on 27 April 1893 and whilst Ballance had favoured Robert Stout as his successor, the caucus selected Richard Seddon instead. The Seddon Ministry was in power from 1 May 1893 until 10 June 1906, when Seddon in turn died.

Initial composition of the 11th Parliament
74 seats were created across 66 electorates.

While the Liberal party was the only established party structure at the time, many independent conservative MPs coalesced as a semi-formal conservative opposition under the leadership of John Bryce. Due to the loose nature of this grouping it is difficult to determine the affiliation of some Independent MPs.

Table footnotes:

Changes during 11th Parliament
There were a number of changes during the term of the 11th Parliament.

Notes

References

11